Sacred Heart College (SHC), Marymount Campus is a Catholic school in the Marist tradition. Currently Marymount Campus is a girls' middle school for Yrs 6–9. From 2019, SHC will consist of Champagnat Campus, co-educational for Yrs 7–9 at Mitchell Park and a Senior School Campus, co-educational for Yrs 10–12 at Somerton Park.

Founded by the Sisters of the Good Samaritan, Marymount belongs to a group of three educational facilities, known as the Tri-School partnership. This group also consists of Sacred Heart College Senior and Sacred Heart College Middle School. Most of the students that pass through either of the middle schools continue on to the senior school, located nearby Marymount, in Somerton Park. The school has four houses: Adamson, McEwen, McLaughlin and Polding.
The school became defunct in 2018 and it merged with Sacred Heart College. The school is still honoured by Sacred Heart College with a building named after the school.

See also
List of schools in South Australia

Private schools in Adelaide
Educational institutions established in 1956
High schools in South Australia
1956 establishments in Australia